Maesycrugiau railway station also Maes-y-crugiau railway station served the hamlet and rural locale of Maesycrugiau near Llanllwni on the Carmarthen Aberystwyth Line in the Welsh county of Carmarthen.

History
The Manchester and Milford Railway (M&MR) opened from Pencader to Aberystwyth on 12 August 1867. The line went into receivership from 1875 to 1900.

The Great Western Railway took over the service in 1906, and fully absorbed the line in 1911. The Great Western Railway and the station passed on to British Railways on nationalisation in 1948. It was then closed by the British Railways Board.

The OS map shows that the station had a signal box, goods yard, and a passing loop.

On 19 August 1890, due to boiler defects and poor design, an engine boiler exploded whilst at Maesycrugiau. No one was injured in the accident.

Born in 1871, Evan Davies recalled that Maesycrugiau was "a one man Station, single Iine, and the Station-master  was the porter, signalman and all, pleased to have a bit of help to shunt the trucks from us boys".

The station house is still present as is the nearby Railway Inn.

References 
Notes

Sources
 
 
 

Disused railway stations in Ceredigion
Railway stations in Great Britain opened in 1866
Railway stations in Great Britain closed in 1965
Former Great Western Railway stations
1866 establishments in Wales
Beeching closures in Wales
1965 disestablishments in Wales